Ali Mohamed Shein (born 13 March 1948) was the 7th President of Zanzibar, from 2010 to 2020. He was previously Vice President of Tanzania from 2001 to 2010. Shein is originally from the island of Pemba, and he is a member of the ruling Chama Cha Mapinduzi (CCM) party. He is a medical doctor by profession.

Political career

Shein was appointed by the President of Zanzibar to be a Member of the House of Representatives on 29 October 1995.
He was then appointed Deputy Minister of Health on 12 November 1995. From 6 November 2000, he was a Member of the House of Representatives at Mkanyageni Constituency in Zanzibar before being appointed to be a Minister of State, President's Office, Constitution, and Good Governance in Zanzibar on 22 November 2000, and Vice President of Tanzania in July 2001.

Shein has been nominated by the ruling party CCM on 9 July 2010 as a presidential candidate for CCM in Zanzibar. Shein got 117 votes while Bilali and Shamsi Vuai Nahodha got 54 and 33 respectively and was elected a new president of Zanzibar and the only one from Pemba Island by 50.1% on 31 October 2010.

Honours and awards
Honorary degrees
 College of Pathologists of East, Central and Southern Africa (COPECSA), September 2014

References

External links 

Vice-President

1948 births
Living people
Vice-presidents of Tanzania
Presidents of Zanzibar
Chama Cha Mapinduzi politicians
Zanzibari politicians
Tanzanian pathologists
Tanzanian Muslims
Odesa University alumni
Alumni of Newcastle University
Voronezh State University alumni
Lumumba Secondary School alumni